Cherry Mobile Fusion Bolt is an Android-based tablet by Cherry Mobile, announced and released in March 2013. Its main features are 7" HD IPS Capacitive Touch Panel a WiFi connection and a Long Lasting 4000 mAH Battery. This is the first tablet of Cherry Mobile to run on Android Jelly Bean and a Quad Core Processor.

Features
Fusion Bolt features an Android 4.1.1 Jelly Bean OS, and it has a multimedia features and integrated social networking, Including Google Voice Search, Google Play Services and more. The Device sports a 1 Ghz. Quad Core Processor, 8 GB Internal Memory + 1 GB RAM and supports up to 32 GB of removable storage through a microSD card. It has a 2 MP Camera for capture moments and a VGA Front Camera for Video Calling. And you can use this tablet like an powerbank using a USB-On The Go (USB-OTG).

Display 
Fusion Bolt uses a 7" High Definition Capacitive Touch Screen with a In-Plane-Switching or (IPS) technology.

See also
List of Android devices
Cherry Mobile

Tablet computers